The 2012–13 Dartmouth Big Green men's basketball team represented Dartmouth College during the 2012–13 NCAA Division I men's basketball season. The Big Green, led by third year head coach Paul Cormier, played their home games at Leede Arena and were members of the Ivy League. They finished the season 9–19, 5–9 in Ivy League play to finish in a tie for sixth place.

Roster

Schedule

|-
!colspan=9| Regular Season

References

Dartmouth Big Green men's basketball seasons
Dartmouth
Dart
Dart